This is a list of the main career statistics of professional Italian tennis player Francesca Schiavone.

Performance timelines

Only main-draw results in WTA Tour, Grand Slam tournaments, Fed Cup and Olympic Games are included in win–loss records.

Singles

Doubles

Grand Slam finals

Singles: 2 (1 title, 1 runner-up)

Doubles: 1 (1 runner-up)

Other significant finals

WTA Premier Mandatory & 5 finals

Singles: 1 final (1 runner-up)

Doubles: 4 (2 titles, 2 runners-up)

WTA Tour career finals

Singles: 20 (8 titles, 12 runner-ups)

Doubles: 16 (7 titles, 9 runner-ups)

ITF finals

Singles: 3 (3 runner-ups)

Doubles: 2 (1 title, 1 runner-up)

WTA Tour career earnings
Schiavone earned more than 11 million dollars during her career.

Record against other players

Record against top 10 players
Schiavone's record against players who have been ranked in the top 10. Active players are in boldface.

No. 1 wins

Top 10 wins

Notes

References

External links
 
 
 

Schiavone, Francesca